Henry Algernon George Percy, Earl Percy (21 January 1871 – 30 December 1909), sometimes styled as Lord Percy or, until 1899, Lord Warkworth, was a British Conservative politician. He held political office under Arthur Balfour as Under-Secretary of State for India and Under-Secretary of State for Foreign Affairs before his early death in 1909.

Background

Percy was the eldest son of Henry Percy, 7th Duke of Northumberland, and his wife Lady Edith, daughter of George Campbell, 8th Duke of Argyll. Alan Percy, 8th Duke of Northumberland, and Eustace Percy, 1st Baron Percy of Newcastle, were his younger brothers.

He was educated at Eton College and Christ Church, Oxford.

Political career
Percy was returned to Parliament for Kensington South in a November 1895 by-election, replacing the ennobled Sir Algernon Borthwick. In August 1902 he was appointed Under-Secretary of State for India in the Conservative administration of Arthur Balfour, a post he held until 1903, and was then Under-Secretary of State for Foreign Affairs under Balfour from 1903 to 1905.

Personal life
Lord Percy died in Paris in December 1909, aged 38. The official cause of death was pleurisy although there were rumours that he had been mortally wounded in a duel.

Further unfounded rumours circulated that he had been murdered on the orders of Winston Churchill, then a rising politician, and that Percy had been the lover of Clementine Hozier, whom Churchill married in 1908. Churchill's mild-mannered brother Jack was whispered to have been the unlikely perpetrator of this act.

Percy was unmarried and his younger brother Alan succeeded their father in the dukedom.

See also
Duke of Northumberland

References

External links 
 

1871 births
1909 deaths
People educated at Eton College
Alumni of Christ Church, Oxford
Henry Percy, Earl Percy
Conservative Party (UK) MPs for English constituencies
UK MPs 1895–1900
UK MPs 1900–1906
UK MPs 1906–1910
Heirs apparent who never acceded
Courtesy earls